Chen Wen-hui (born 1943) is a Taiwanese educator and politician who served a single term on the Legislative Yuan, representing Miaoli County from 1996 to 1999.

Education and teaching career
Chen Wen-hui completed a master's degree in education at National Chengchi University. He led the Hsinchu Normal College and Pingtung Normal Vocational College as principal.

Political career
While serving as a campaign aide to Shih Hsing-jung, a candidate contesting the Hsinchu City mayoralty in 1985, Chen Wen-hui was accused of planning a large demonstration against election fraud that occurred in Hsinchu on 16 November 1985. Court proceedings against Chen and nine others began the next month, during which they claimed that they had been subject to torture. From prison, Chen launched his own campaign for a seat on the Miaoli County Council in January 1986. Though he was never present at any campaign functions, Chen finished first when votes were counted on 1 February. Two days later, Chen was sentenced to two years imprisonment. Despite a number of petitions on his behalf, Chen was unable to attend the 1 March 1986 inauguration of councilors, as the court refused to release him on bail. The Taiwan High Court heard an appeal of Chen's case on 7 April 1986, and upheld the earlier ruling. He contested a Legislative Yuan seat from Miaoli County as a member of the Democratic Progressive Party in 1995, and won. Chen lost reelection while affiliated with the Taiwan Independence Party in 1998. He has also served as deputy education minister within the Taiwan Provincial Government and led the department of education within Taipei City Government.

Personal life
Chen Wen-hui's wife, the potter Chen Yu-hsiu, established a kiln in Yuanli, Miaoli, in March 1984. During his imprisonment, Chen Wen-hui read about the flora of Taiwan. After his release, Chen created a botanical garden around his wife's pottery operations. The largest kiln in Huataoyao was damaged during the 1999 Jiji earthquake. Huataoyao also has a restaurant.

References

1943 births
Living people
Miaoli County Members of the Legislative Yuan
Members of the 3rd Legislative Yuan
Democratic Progressive Party Members of the Legislative Yuan
Taiwan Independence Party politicians
Heads of schools in Taiwan
20th-century Taiwanese educators
Taiwanese prisoners and detainees
Prisoners and detainees of Taiwan